"Neckbeard" is a pejorative term and stereotype for an adult man or teenage boy who exhibits characteristics such as social awkwardness, underachievement, or pretentiousness. The term is associated with the currently (2010–present) unfashionable facial hair style known as a neck beard, and by extension, to a stereotype of overweight, unkempt internet users, and overlaps with the nerd, gamer, and geek subcultures. The term has also been associated with anti-feminist internet users. Sometimes this Term is used for insulting pedophiles.

Examples 
 Some regard Comic Book Guy from The Simpsons as a neckbeard due to his appearance, pretentiousness, and love for comic books.
 Some regard the character Plague in The Girl with the Dragon Tattoo as a neckbeard.
 In South Parks "Make Love, Not Warcraft" episode, there is a neckbeard named Jenkins who spends all of his time playing World of Warcraft.

References 

Pejorative terms for men
Subcultures
Epithets related to nerd culture